Mesner Branch is a stream in Shelby County in the U.S. state of Missouri.  It is a tributary of the North River.

A variant spelling was "Messner Branch". The stream has the name of F. K. Messner, an early settler.

See also
List of rivers of Missouri

References

Rivers of Shelby County, Missouri
Rivers of Missouri